The following is a list of notable events and releases of the year 1932 in Norwegian music.

Events

Deaths

 September
 24 – Gabriel Tischendorf, organist and composer (born 1842).

  December
 24 – Eyvind Alnæs, composer, known especially for his operas (born 1872).

Births

 January
 22 – Tor Brevik, composer (died 2018).

 February
 5 – Ketil Vea, composer and music teacher (died 2015).

 March
 4 – Sigurd Jansen, composer, pianist, and orchestra conductor.
 11 – Atle Hammer, Norwegian trumpeter (died 2017).

 May
 21 – Sven Nyhus, traditional folk musician, fiddler, composer and musicologist.

 August
 5 – Børt-Erik Thoresen, television host and folk singer (died 2011).

 September
 4 – Per Müller, musician and singer (died 2016).

 October

See also
 1932 in Norway
 Music of Norway

References

 
Norwegian music
Norwegian
Music
1930s in Norwegian music